"Ego" is a song performed by English musician Elton John released in early 1978 as a standalone single. It was written by John and Bernie Taupin.

Background
The song was originally written during the sessions for his 1976 album Blue Moves, but was left out. Elton said of the song by the time of its release:

"Ego was just something I had lying around, and I wanted to release it for a long time. Unfortunately, the time wasn't right. It's been disappointing. I really had hoped it would do well because I really liked it. I wrote the song jointly with Bernie Taupin, and we never thought of it as an autobiography until it came out. It's about the silliness of rock 'n' roll stars, and the video film was supposed to show just how stupid rock 'n' roll can be. It's the grotesque side of rock 'n' roll. And it's turned out to be one of the most sincere songs we've ever written."

It starts with a rollicking piano accompanied by a train whistle, making it sound like there's a train rolling down a track. The song then goes into a steady 4/4 beat, then breaks down and goes to the chorus. Later in the song it transforms into an uptempo waltz and then reverts to 4/4. It features synthesizers, and even carnival-esque organs, unusual for its time.

Release
It was released as a single in early 1978, and did not appear on the album released in the same year, A Single Man. John played this song live from 1978 up until 1980. The single reached #34 in both the UK
and the US.

The song was not available on CD until the 1990 release of To Be Continued.... Later, in remastered form, it was added to the reissue of A Single Man along with four B-sides from the era.

Reception
Cash Box said that the "piano licks resemble Keystone Cop silent film score" and praised the vocals and guitar playing. Record World called it "one of [John's] most complex songs," with "ironic lyrics and unusual chord progressions to make a powerful point."

Music video
A music video was made, directed by Michael Lindsay-Hogg, features John Emberton who played Elton John as a small boy in the video acting out a scene from Romeo & Juliet. John Emberton's sister Penny played a member of the audience.

Personnel
Elton John – piano, vocals, synthesizers, organ
Tim Renwick – guitars
Clive Franks – bass guitar
Steve Holley – drums
Ray Cooper – tambourine, vibraphone, train whistle
Paul Buckmaster – orchestral arrangements

References

1978 singles
Elton John songs
Songs with lyrics by Bernie Taupin
Songs with music by Elton John
1978 songs
The Rocket Record Company singles
MCA Records singles